Top of the Pops is a former British television programme.

Top of the Pops may also refer to:

Spin-offs of the TV show 
 Top of the Pops 2, an offshoot featuring archive footage from Top of the Pops
 Top of the Pops Reloaded, a children's programme
 Top of the Pops (magazine), a monthly pop-culture publication published by Immediate Media Company

Musical works 
 Top of the Pops (record series), a series of albums issued by Pickwick Records
 "Top of the Pops" (song), a 1991 song by The Smithereens 
 "Top of the Pops", a song by The Kinks, from the album Lola Versus Powerman and the Moneygoround, Part One
 "Top of the Pops", a song by The Blue Aeroplanes 1994
 "Top of the Pops", a song by Dave Davani Four,  Johnnie Stewart and Harry Rabinowitz 1965, theme tune to Top of the Pops during the 1960s
 "Top of the Pops", a song by Disco Zombies 1979
 "Top of the Pops", a song by The New Establishment 1974
 "Top of the Pops", a song by The Rezillos 1978
 "Top of the Pops", a song by The Rivals (band) 1978
"(I Can't Stand) Top Of The Pops" by Indecent Assault (band) 1986

See also
 TopPop, a Dutch TV show 1970-1988
 TOTP (disambiguation)